Herzenberg is a surname. Notable people with the surname include:

Caroline Herzenberg (born 1932), American physicist
Elena Herzenberg
Leonard Herzenberg (1931–2013), American immunologist
Leonore Herzenberg (born 1935), American immunologist

German-language surnames